Madatharuvi case refers to a murder in Kerala, India. The case involved the 1966 murder of a widow named Mariyakutty. A priest, Fr. Benedict Onamkulam, was convicted of the crime. Sessions court sentenced the priest to death but the Church 
approached the high court and freed him.
His supporters claim that he knew the culprit, but he didn't break the seal of confession.

Prosecution 
The prosecution alleged that the Syro-Malabar Catholic priest Fr. Benedict Onamkulam had killed Mariyakutty at the stream of Madatharuvi, near Ranni with the motive of ending their affair. Onamkulam was sentenced to death by the session court, however, the High court of Kerala acquitted and freed him purely based on technical grounds dismissing circumstantial evidence in 1967.

The case has been so sensational in Kerala that it inspired a number films. It came into prominence in local media again in 2010 when the Changanassery Bishop opened Fr. Benidict's tomb for prayers at Athirampuzha.

Films
Mynatharuvi Kolakase (1967)

References

Murder in India
Crime in Kerala
1966 murders in India